Alla Kudryavtseva was the defending champion and reached the semifinals, but retired against Eva Birnerová due to a left hamstring strain.

Birnerová was later defeated in the final by Ksenia Pervak, 6–3, 6–1.

Seeds

  Ksenia Pervak (champion)
  Bojana Jovanovski (first round)
  Pauline Parmentier (first round)
  Anastasija Sevastova (second round)
  Magdaléna Rybáriková (second round)
  Alla Kudryavtseva (semifinals, retired due to a left hamstring strain)
  Evgeniya Rodina (second round)
  Aravane Rezaï (first round)

Main draw

Finals

Top half

Bottom half

Qualifying draw

Seeds

  Mădălina Gojnea (qualifying competition)
  Yurika Sema (second round)
  Eirini Georgatou (qualified)
  Marta Sirotkina (qualifying competition)
  Aleksandra Krunić (qualified)
  Victoria Larrière (qualified)
  Tetyana Arefyeva (second round)
  Ryōko Fuda (second round)

Qualifiers

  Jana Čepelová
  Victoria Larrière
  Eirini Georgatou
  Aleksandra Krunić

First qualifier

Second qualifier

Third qualifier

Fourth qualifier

References
 Main Draw
 Qualifying Draw

2011 WTA Tour
Singles